Jaya Jaya Jaya Jaya Hey is a 2022 Indian Malayalam-language family drama film directed by Vipin Das. The film stars Darshana Rajendran and Basil Joseph. Jaya Jaya Jaya Jaya Hey was released theatrically on 28 October 2022. A satire on gender stereotypes, the film received highly positive reviews from both critics and audiences.

Plot
Jaya is a smart and ambitious girl from a middle class family. Her family, and her busy-body maternal  uncle, under the guise of protecting her, take every decision for her. Her parents take an active interest in her brother's future and enrolls him in a college even though it was very expensive. But, when it was Jaya's turn, they give no importance to her interests or passion and enrolls her in a parallel college nearby. Despite all this, Jaya tries to take control of her life and rebels against her parents occasionally. After one such rebellion, involving a romance with an outwardly progressive and feminist college lecturer who is revealed to be an insecure and possessive chauvinist,  her parents decide to marry Jaya off before she gets to complete her education. 

Rajesh is a poultry farm owner and is deemed the perfect groom for Jaya, despite his lack of education and knowledge of anything outside poultry business, especially after he agrees to let Jaya continue her studies. After their marriage, Jaya finds out that Rajesh is short-tempered, aggressive, and has little regard for others. He also postpones Jaya's education for no reason. He is set in his ways and is adamant that everything that goes on in the house is as per his likes and dislikes. Things get worse soon and Rajesh starts physically abusing Jaya. He slaps her for the smallest of reasons and this becomes a regular affair in "Raj Bhavan". Jaya tries to get the support of her parents. But they tell her to "adjust" and continue being the ideal wife.

Soon, Jaya realizes the hard truth that no one will come to her aid. Jaya decides to take action rather than wait for Rajesh to become a better husband. She starts learning Taekwondo using YouTube and practices it in her bathroom and bedroom, unbeknownst to anyone. Eventually, Jaya beats up and kicks Rajesh into a table when he attempts to snatch her phone. Rajesh remains mum about this fearing humiliation and finally reveals to Ani, his cousin on how to deal with this. He starts learning Karate to take revenge. He sets up his phone on record and provokes Jaya into beating him up so he can black mail her. Unfortunately for him, she kicks him into the phone.

This incident is witnessed by Rajesh's mother and Jaya's parents are called over. The issue is settled with Jaya and Rajesh being made forcibly to apologize to each other. Ani and Rajesh conspire into making Jaya believe Rajesh has changed for good so he can impregnate her and confine her to a family life. This works out for a while and Jaya becomes pregnant, believing Rajesh to be a better and loving husband. She gets suspicious, however, when, at a doctor’s visit, Rajesh seems to know more about her last period than her, implying to her that he has been trying to get her pregnant.  She becomes more suspicious when she catches a glimpse of a’plan’ in a message between Rajesh and Ani. She confronts Rajesh, and the truth is revealed when Rajesh arrogantly confesses that he has not changed and his and Ani’s plan was to get her pregnant so that she will be confined to the life of a homemaker. This shocks her, following which her blood pressure spikes and leads her into a miscarriage.

Both Jaya's and Rajesh's family blame Jaya for the miscarriage following which she walks out on them and starts living in a working women's hostel with her brother's help. She attempts to open a tailoring unit but has trouble securing a loan as she had not completed her degree. Meanwhile, the video of Jaya beating up Rajesh goes viral after the phone repairmen uploaded it online. Rajesh has his ego injured by the fact everyone knows he was beat up by his wife, and attempts for a divorce. He rues to his workers about how a woman can be happy even after divorces because they are capable of supporting themselves, but men can't as they are dependent on a woman for their needs. Rajesh’s business also starts losing customers to his rival whom he refused to help earlier.

In the court, the presiding judge initially berates Jaya for assaulting Rajesh, believing him to be innocent. But the truth comes to light as Jaya says that the divorce reached the court only because Jaya was unaware of it because Rajesh didn't consult her. Rajesh reveals his chauvinistic and arrogant nature in the courtroom, in front of the judge, who is a woman. The judge calls out Rajesh on his lack of knowledge of a woman's needs and role in a family and tells him that a woman requires equality, liberty and justice in a healthy family. She then tells the duo to sort everything out. Jaya signs the divorce paper not before condescendingly asking the price for chicken as a parallel to their first meeting. She tells him  she sells her chicken at a lower price than him, revealing that she had taken over a rival's poultry farm after Rajesh had refused to take it over. Her business decisions led to her company getting higher profits. The last scene is Jaya beating off Rajesh's goons who had come to intimidate the previous owner of the company to increase his prices.

Cast

Production
The director, Vipin Das announced the film on 26 January 2022 by releasing its poster. The shooting of the movie began in Kollam on 12 May 2022 after the pooja ceremony. The shooting lasted for about 42 days. The filming of the movie was competed on 21 June 2022. The film was censored with a U-certificate one week prior to its release.

Soundtrack

Release

Theatrical
Initially the film was planned to be released on 21 October 2022. Then the makers postponed it by a week and was released in theatres on 28 October 2022.

Home media
The digital rights of the film is acquired by Disney+ Hotstar. The satellite rights of the film is owned by Asianet.

Reception

Critical response 
In a mixed review for Firstpost, Anna M. M. Vetticad stated that “The film’s overall blend is off balance, but in one key area it remains unfailingly on message: its tone consistently mocks abuse and abusers, never the abused.” Rating the film 2.75/5, she wrote that it was “a film that is purportedly about a survivor of domestic violence but does not give (the protagonist) the interiority her husband gets.” Padmakumar K of Onmanorama reviewed the film as subtly told in the light of humour, the narrative drives home the point with a punch and thereby breaks several romantic conventions, both in cinema and in society.

Box office
The film was made on a budget of  crores. It grossed over  crores in 25 days from box office.

References

External links

2022 films
2022 comedy-drama films
Indian comedy-drama films
2020s Malayalam-language films
Films about Indian weddings
Films shot in Kollam